The white-breasted guineafowl (Agelastes meleagrides) is a medium-sized, up to 45 cm long, terrestrial bird of the guineafowl family.

Description
It has a black plumage with a small, bare, red head, white breast, long, black tail, greenish-brown bill, and greyish feet. The sexes are similar, although the female is slightly smaller than the male.

Distribution
The white-breasted guineafowl is distributed in subtropical West African forests of Côte d'Ivoire, Ghana, Guinea, Liberia, and Sierra Leone. Although preferring a more dry climate, the species prioritizes forest coverage causing the distribution of the species to have a much broader distribution.

Diet
Its diet consists mainly of seeds, berries, termites, and small animals.

Conservation
Due to ongoing habitat loss and hunting in some areas, the white-breasted guineafowl is rated as vulnerable on the IUCN Red List.

References 

Freeman, B., Jiménez-García, D., Barca, B., & Grainger, M. (2019)

WALTERT, M., SEIFERT, C., RADL, G., & HOPPE-DOMINIK, B. (2010)

External links 
 BirdLife Species Factsheet

white-breasted guineafowl
Birds of West Africa
white-breasted guineafowl
white-breasted guineafowl